The Bear Creek School is a preschool through grade twelve private school in Redmond, Washington. Educating around 840 students, the school is a non-denominational Christian religious school, focusing on college preparation. It was established in 1988. The head of school is Patrick Carruth. As of 2020, school review website Niche ranks The Bear Creek School as the best Christian high school, third best private K-12 school, and seventh best college prep private high schools in Washington state.

Campuses
The Bear Creek School has three campuses in Redmond, Washington. The main campus houses lower school, early middle school, and middle school. The second, or valley, campus houses preschool and pre-k. The third campus or upper campus houses upper school.

Academics 
In profiles of the school, The Bear Creek School was one of 50 private schools nationwide selected in the 2014 Blue Ribbon School of Excellence and the only school in the State of Washington, public or private, recognized by U.S. Secretary of Education Arne Duncan.

The Bear Creek School is accredited by the Northwest Commission of Colleges and Universities and the Northwest Association of Independent Schools. The school is also a member of the Association of Christian Schools International.

Despite being a small school, Bear Creek students have had consistent successes in the National Merit Scholarship competition:
 2002: one National Merit semifinalist.
 2003: three National Merit semifinalists.
 2005: two National Merit semifinalists.
 2006: four National Merit semifinalists.
 2007: two National Merit semifinalists.
 2008: two National Merit semifinalists.
 2009: one National Merit semifinalist.
 2010: one National Merit semifinalist.
 2011: three National Merit semifinalists  
 2012: three National Merit semifinalists
 2013: three National Merit semifinalists
 2014: one National Merit semifinalist
 2015: three National Merit semifinalists

Athletics 
The school is a member of the Washington Interscholastic Activities Association (WIAA), participating as a member of the Emerald City 1A League and the CrossTown Middle School League. In 2014, The Bear Creek School opted up to the 1A classification. Numerous teams have won academic state titles.

Performances of note:

Basketball
 In 2007, Will Sanger walked on to the University of Tulsa basketball team, which competes in Division I (NCAA).
 The boys' varsity basketball team took fifth in 2008 and 2010 and third in 2011 and 2014 in the WIAA 2B boys' basketball state tournament.

Golf
 Marianne Banton placed second in the Class 1A/B state girls' golf tournament in 2004 and first in 2005. In 2007, Sydney Conway won the Class 2B/1B golf girls' individual title.
 In 2011, The varsity boys' golf team won the 2B/1B state tournament.
In 2018, freshman Tiger Liu won the inaugural state Long Drive Competition, with a record distance of 370 yards.

Soccer
 In 2006, the varsity boys' soccer team won the 1B/2B state soccer championship over Northwest Christian in a penalty kick shoot out. The team also took second place in 2009.
 In 2011, the Varsity Girls' Soccer team won the 1B/2B state soccer championship in a penalty kick shootout. 
 In 2012,  the Lady Grizzlies became the first 1B/2B soccer program to win Back-to-Back state championships. They beat Napavine High School 4-0 in the State Title game.
 In 2013 the Lady Grizzlies once again made it to the Girls' Soccer 1B/2B State Title Game, however falling 0-1 to underdog Crosspoint Academy.

Tennis
 In 2009, freshman Jacob Imam won the 1A/2B/1B state singles tennis title.  In 2010, he and senior Jamie Meyer placed second in the 1A/2B/1B state doubles tennis championships.

Track & Field
 In 2009, freshman Madelyn Magee placed second in the 2B state high jump competition; in 2010 2011, and 2012  she placed first.  In the 2010 and 2012 outdoor seasons, she recorded the highest jump for high school girls in any division in the state.  She signed with Columbia University.

Other Sports
 Student Cara Linnenkohl took sixth place in the women's pair final at the FISA World Rowing Junior Championships in Beijing in 2007, and second in the single in 2008 in Austria.
 Student Kimi Pohlman signed with the University of Washington in November 2007 to play softball for the Huskies. Along with her accomplishments in softball, Pohlman also excelled in track, soccer, and basketball.

History 
 1988 - School founded by Drs. Nancy and William Price on the campus of Bear Creek Community Church, Woodinville, WA.
 2000 - Redmond Campus is opened.
 2005 - School acquires new Valley Campus to start a new K-6 campus, after leaving former Woodinville campus.
 2006 - Nancy Price resigns from her position as the head of school to pursue mission work in Africa.
 2006 - Karen Beman is appointed Interim Head of School.
 2007 - The Board of Directors announces Patrick B. Carruth as the new head of school from July 1, 2007.
 2015 -Upper school campus opens.

School symbols
The school's original crest displays four symbols surrounding a cross: a book and pen signifying the arts; an atom, the sciences; a winged shoe, athletics; and an honor torch, personal character. Above the crest is the Latin motto of the School, Credo Ut Intelligam, which means, "I believe so that I may understand."  A more recently updated crest shows a cross and a path. The cross represents the school's Christian foundation, while the path represents the path of life. 
The motto, chosen by the founders, is traceable to St. Anselm and St. Augustine before him.

Notable faculty 
 Stephen C. Meyer, vice president of the Discovery Institute, is a former board member.

References

External links 
 Official site

Private elementary schools in Washington (state)
Private middle schools in Washington (state)
High schools in King County, Washington
Educational institutions established in 1988
Schools in Redmond, Washington
Private high schools in Washington (state)
Preparatory schools in Washington (state)
1988 establishments in Washington (state)